Nerdcore hiphop may refer to:

Nerdcore hip hop, a musical genre
Nerdcore Hiphop (album), a demo album by MC Frontalot, as well as a song on that album